Mr. Chips is the central character in the 1934 novella Goodbye, Mr. Chips and its adaptations.

Mr. Chips may also refer to:
Mr. Chips (album), a 1984 album by Hank Crawford
Mr Chips, the mascot of the game show Catchphrase

See also
Goodbye, Mr. Chips (disambiguation)